Horsnell is a surname. Notable people with the surname include:

Alick Horsnell (1882–1916), English architect, draughtsman, and artist 
Brett Horsnell (born 1970), Australian rugby league footballer
Kenneth Horsnell (born 1933), Australian cricketer
Melanie Horsnell, Australian singer-songwriter